Phase 10 is a card game created in 1982 in Cambodia and sold by Mattel, which purchased the rights from Fundex Games in 2010.  Phase 10 is based on a variant of rummy known as contract rummy.  It consists of a special deck equivalent to two regular decks of cards, and can be played by two to six people.  The game is named after the ten phases (or melds) that a player must advance through in order to win. Many people shorten the game by aligning it to baseball rules and consider 5.5 phases to be a complete game when running out of time to complete the full ten phases. Whoever is in the lead when play stops if someone has completed 5.5 phases or more is the winner. 

Phase 10 was Fundex's best selling product, selling over 62,600,000 units as of 2016, making it the 2nd best-selling commercial card game behind Mattel's Uno. In December 2010, Fundex sold its license rights to Phase 10 to Mattel.

Objective 

The object of the game is to be the first person to complete all ten phases.  In the case of two players completing the last phase in the same hand, the player who completed the last phase with the lowest overall score is the winner. If those scores also happen to be tied, a tiebreaker round is played where the tying players attempt to complete phase ten (or in variants, the last phase each player had tried to complete in the previous round).

For each hand, each player's object is to complete and lay down the current phase, and then rid their hand of remaining cards by discarding them on laid-down Phases, called "hitting". The player who does this first wins the hand and scores no penalty; all other players are assessed penalty points according to the value of cards remaining in their hand.

There are one hundred and eight cards in a deck:
 ninety-six numbered cards: two of each value from one through twelve, in each of four colors. Therefore, there are 24 cards of each color and eight of each value.
 eight Wild cards;
 four Skip cards;
With two regular decks of cards, the suits can represent the four different colors, kings can represent the wild cards, and jokers can represent the skip cards.

Phases

A phase is a combination of cards. Phases are usually composed of sets (multiple cards of the same value), runs (multiple cards in consecutive ascending order), cards of one color, or a combination of these. As the name suggests, there are ten phases:

Original and Master's Edition Phases:

 Phase 1:  2 sets of 3
 Phase 2:  1 set of 3 + 1 run of 4
 Phase 3:  1 set of 4 + 1 run of 4
 Phase 4:  1 run of 7
 Phase 5:  1 run of 8
 Phase 6:  1 run of 9
 Phase 7:  2 sets of 4
 Phase 8:  7 cards of one color
 Phase 9:  1 set of 5 + 1 set of 2
 Phase 10: 1 set of 5 + 1 set of 3
Phase 10 Twist Phases:

 Phase 1:  3 sets of 3
 Phase 2:  4 sets of 2
 Phase 3:  1 set of 5 + 1 run of 4
 Phase 4:  2 sets of 3 + 1 run of 3
 Phase 5:  1 set of 3 + 1 run of 6
 Phase 6:  2 runs of 4
 Phase 7:  1 run of 4 + 4 cards of one color
 Phase 8:  1 run of 5 of one color
 Phase 9:  8 cards of one color
 Phase 10: 9 cards of one color

Definitions

Set: A set is made of two or more cards with the same number and any color.
Run: A run (similar to a straight) is made of three or more cards numbered in order, in any color.  Runs can go from one to twelve. 
 Color: Phase 8 of the original and Master's Edition, and several phases of Phase 10 Twist, require the player to collect cards that are all the same color (or suit, if using ordinary playing cards). Runs do not have to be all one color (as in many standard-deck Rummy variants). Wilds, despite having a printed color in certain editions, can be used to represent any color, and Skips, despite being blue in certain editions, cannot be used to complete this (or any) Phase.
 Even or Odd: An even or odd is made of two or more cards that are either even (2,4,6,8,10,12), or odd (1,3,5,7,9,11).

 How to play 

One player is chosen to be the dealer (alternately, the deal can rotate to the left after each hand).  The dealer shuffles the deck and deals 10 cards, face down, one at a time, to each player.  Players hold their 10 cards in hand so that the other players cannot see them.  The remaining deck is placed face-down in the center of the play area to become the draw pile. A wild card turned up goes to the next player.  The dealer then turns the top card of the draw pile over and places it next to the draw pile, to become the discard pile.  During the first hand, all players try to complete Phase 1. Play consists of;
 1. Drawing a card from either the draw pile or the discard pile
 2. Laying down their completed current phase (if possible)
 3. Hitting on other players phases once they have laid down their own phase. (on the same hand)
 4. Placing one card on the discard pile.

 Completing phases 

 Phases must be made in order, from 1 to 10.
 A player must have the whole Phase in hand before laying it down.
 A player may lay down more than the minimum requirements of a Phase, but only if the additional cards can be directly added to the cards already in the Phase. For instance, if a Phase requires a set of 3 but the player has four of that card, the player may lay down all four cards when completing the Phase.
 Only one Phase may be made per hand. For instance, a player who must make a run of 7 cards (Phase 4) cannot complete the next two Phases in the same hand by laying down a run of 9.
 If a player successfully makes a Phase, then they try to make the next Phase in the next hand.  If they fail to make a Phase, they must try to make the same Phase again in the next hand.  As a result, players may not all be working on the same Phase in the same hand.
 Players receive credit for making a Phase as soon as it is laid down.  A player does not need to win the hand in order to receive credit for the Phase.  Several players will often complete their Phase in the same hand.

 Hitting 

Hitting is the way to get rid of leftover cards after making a Phase.  A hit is made by putting a card directly on a Phase already laid down.  The cards must properly fit with the cards already down.  Before a player can make a hit, their own Phase must already be laid down.  A player may only hit during their turn.  A player may hit any combination of their own Phase and other player's Phases, and may hit with as many cards as can be played from the player's hand on a single turn.  Players are not allowed to replace a wild card in a Phase with the card from their hand matching the card the Wild stands for. Replacing Wild Cards is a possible Variant Rule.

 Going out / finishing a hand 

After laying down a Phase, players try to "go out" as soon as possible.  To go out, a player must get rid of all of their cards by hitting and discarding. Any  players who completed their Phase, will advance to the next Phase for the next hand, while any player not able to complete their Phase remain on that same Phase for the next hand.  Players count up the total value of cards left in their hands (the fewer cards left in their hand, the better) and score them as follows;

 five points(5) for each card with value 1-9
 ten points(10) for each card with value 10-12
 fifteen points(15) for a Skip
 twenty-five points(25) for a Wild

Each player's score for the hand is added to that player's running total (players who did not complete their Phase cannot have a score of less than 50 for the hand and often have far more with the inclusion of extra points for large values and wilds; this is known as being "set" similar to Hearts or Spades), the deal rotates to the left, all the cards are shuffled and a new hand begins. Again, if a player did not complete their Phase before another player went out, they must work on the same Phase in the next hand.

 Winning 

If only one player is attempting Phase number 10 on the hand and they complete the Phase, they become the winner and the game ends immediately. If two or more players complete Phase 10 in the same hand, then the player who has completed phase ten and has the lowest total points is the winner.  In the event of a tie, the players that tied replay Phase number 10 and the first player to complete their phase and discard all their cards wins.

Variations

 Official Variation Phase Sets Utah Rules:If someone has gone down and used a wild in their phase, if you have gone down you may replace their wild with the card it is placeholding for and move the wild to the left or rightPhase 10 Island Paradise: Phase 1: 1 run of 7
 Phase 2: 1 set of 2 + 2 sets of 3
 Phase 3: 1 run of 6 + 1 set of 2
 Phase 4: 3 sets of 2 + 1 set of 3
 Phase 5: 1 set of 3 + 1 run of 6
 Phase 6: 2 runs of 4
 Phase 7: 3 cards of one color + 1 set of 4
 Phase 8: 8 cards of one color
 Phase 9: 4 cards of one color + 1 set of 5
 Phase 10: 9 cards of one colorPhase 10 Cocoa Canyon: Phase 1: 6 cards of one color
 Phase 2: 7 cards of one color
 Phase 3: 4 cards of one color + 5 cards of one color
 Phase 4: 2 sets of 3
 Phase 5: 1 run of 8
 Phase 6: 1 run of 9
 Phase 7: 1 set of 4 + 1 run of 4
 Phase 8: 10 cards of even or odd
 Phase 9: 1 set of 4 + 1 run of 6
 Phase 10: 1 set of 5 + 1 run of 4Phase 10 Disco Fever: Phase 1: 1 even or odd of 8
 Phase 2: 1 even or odd of 9
 Phase 3: 1 color run of 3 + 2 sets of 2
 Phase 4: 7 of one color
 Phase 5: 1 color run of 5 + 2 sets of 2
 Phase 6: 1 color even or odd of 3 + 1 color even or odd of 4
 Phase 7: 1 color run of 4 + 1 set of 4
 Phase 8: 1 color run of 4 + 3 sets of 2
 Phase 9: 1 run of 3 + 2 sets of 3
 Phase 10: 1 run of 3 + 1 set of 4 + 1 set of 3Phase 10 Cupcake Lounge: Phase 1: 3 of one color + 3 of one color + 4 of one color
 Phase 2: 1 color run of 3 + 2 sets of 2 
 Phase 3: 7 of one color
 Phase 4: 2 sets of 3
 Phase 5: 1 set of 4 + 1 set of 2
 Phase 6: 1 set of 5
 Phase 7: 2 color even or odd of 4
 Phase 8: 1 run of 9
 Phase 9: 1 color run of 5 + 2 sets of 2
 Phase 10: 1 color run of 6 + 1 set of 2Phase 10 Candy Castle / Mountain Vista: Phase 1: 1 run of 3 + 3 sets of 2
 Phase 2: 1 run of 8
 Phase 3: 1 run of 9
 Phase 4: 1 color run of 3 + 1 set of 3
 Phase 5: 1 set of 2 + 2 sets of 3
 Phase 6: 1 set of 2 + 1 set of 3 + 1 set of 4
 Phase 7: 4 of one color + 6 of one color
 Phase 8: 5 of one color + 5 of one color
 Phase 9: 1 run of 5 + 1 set of 3 + 1 set of 2
 Phase 10: 1 run of 3 + 1 set of 4 + 1 set of 3Phase 10 Prehistoric Valley: Phase 1: 1 even or odd of 9
 Phase 2: 1 even or odd of 10
 Phase 3: 1 run of 8
 Phase 4: 1 run of 10
 Phase 5: 2 sets of 3
 Phase 6: 2 sets of 4
 Phase 7: 1 color run of 4
 Phase 8: 1 color run of 3 + 3 of one color
 Phase 9: 1 set of 3 + 1 run of 4
 Phase 10: 1 set of 4 + 1 run of 6Phase 10 Moonlight Drive-In: Phase 1: 1 set of 4 + 1 set of 2
 Phase 2: 2 sets of 3
 Phase 3: 1 run of 7
 Phase 4: 1 run of 8
 Phase 5: 1 set of 2 + 2 sets of 3
 Phase 6: 1 set of 5
 Phase 7: 1 run of 9
 Phase 8: 1 run of 6 + 2 sets of 2
 Phase 9: 1 run of 8 + 1 set of 2
 Phase 10: 1 set of 4 + 1 run of 6Phase 10 Ancient Greece: Phase 1: 1 set of 2 + 1 run of 6
 Phase 2: 1 even or odd of 9
 Phase 3: 1 even or odd of 10
 Phase 4: 1 color run of 3 + 1 set of 3
 Phase 5: 1 set of 3 + 1 run of 5
 Phase 6: 1 set of 5 + 1 run of 4
 Phase 7: 1 color run of 5
 Phase 8: 1 color even or odd of 3 + 1 color even or odd of 5
 Phase 9: 5 sets of 2
 Phase 10: 2 sets of 3 + 2 sets of 2Phase 10 Jazz Club: Phase 1: 1 even or odd of 8
 Phase 2: 1 color run of 3 + 1 set of 3
 Phase 3: 1 even or odd of 9
 Phase 4: 1 color run of 4
 Phase 5: 1 even or odd of 10
 Phase 6: 1 color run of 5
 Phase 7: 1 color even or odd of 5
 Phase 8: 1 color run of 5 + 1 set of 2
 Phase 9: 1 color even or odd of 6
 Phase 10: 1 color run of 5 + 3 of one colorPhase 10 Vintage Gas Station: Phase 1: 1 set of 3 + 1 run of 5
 Phase 2: 1 run of 4 + 1 set of 3 + 1 set of 2
 Phase 3: 1 run of 3 + 1 set of 3 + 2 sets of 2
 Phase 4: 1 color run of 4
 Phase 5: 1 color run of 4 + 1 set of 2
 Phase 6: 1 color run of 4 + 2 sets of 2
 Phase 7: 1 set of 5 + 1 run of 4
 Phase 8: 1 color even or odd of 5
 Phase 9: 1 color even or odd of 6
 Phase 10: 1 color run of 3 + 3 of one color + 1 set of 2Phase 10 Ocean Reef: Phase 1: 1 run of 7
 Phase 2: 1 set of 4 + 1 set of 3
 Phase 3: 1 color run of 5 + 1 set of 2
 Phase 4: 1 even or odd of 10
 Phase 5: 2 runs of 5
 Phase 6: 3 sets of 3
 Phase 7: 1 color run of 4 + 1 set of 3
 Phase 8: 1 color even or odd of 3 + 1 color even or odd of 4
 Phase 9: 1 run of 7 + 1 set of 2
 Phase 10: 1 color run of 5 + 1 set of 3Phase 10 Southwest: Phase 1: 1 set of 2 + 1 run of 6
 Phase 2: 1 even or odd of 9
 Phase 3: 1 even or odd of 10
 Phase 4: 1 color run of 3 + 1 set of 3
 Phase 5: 1 set of 3 + 1 run of 5
 Phase 6: 1 set of 5 + 1 run of 4
 Phase 7: 1 color run of 5
 Phase 8: 1 color even or odd of 3 + 1 color even or odd of 5
 Phase 9: 5 sets of 2
 Phase 10: 2 sets of 3 + 2 sets of 2Phase 10 Okie Circle J: Phase 1: 5 sets of 2
 Phase 2: 1 color run of 10
 Phase 3: 1 set of 4 + 1 color run of 4
 Phase 4: 1 even or odd of 10
 Phase 5: 1 run of 3 + 1 set of 3 + 2 sets of 2
 Phase 6: 1 run of 8
 Phase 7: 1 set of 5 + 1 run of 5
 Phase 8: 1 color run of 8
 Phase 9: 1 color even or odd of 8 + 1 set of 2
 Phase 10: 2 sets of 2 same color + 1 set of 2 + 1 wild + 1 color run of 3

 Floating Variation 

A variation of play is to allow Floating. Instead of going out by discarding their last card, a player draws a card and then play all cards in their hand without discarding. This is known as going out "floating". Because the player must be able to discard a card in order to actually end the hand, other players now have at least one extra turn in which to go out themselves or at least improve their score. In addition, a "floating" player must draw a card and play it if able, and must draw the top card from the discard pile if it can be played; thus the floating player can be forced to play on their next turn instead of drawing and discarding. The floating player can also be skipped as normal. If someone else goes out before the "floater", the floater receives a zero score, but does not technically win the hand.

The strategic value of floating is that the person immediately preceding the floating player is generally forced to try to "keep them afloat" for at least a few turns, either by discarding cards the floating player is required to pick up and play, or by skipping the floater. This generally puts the player preceding the floater at a disadvantage compared to the other players and makes it less likely that that player will be able to finish their Phase if they have not yet done so. Players can use this strategy to "gang up" on one player; the player after them will float, forcing the player to try to keep them afloat while all other players get a number of extra turns to try to lay down their Phase or go out. Of course, the player preceding the floater is not actually forced to keep them afloat and may be able to go out themselves, lay down their Phase (thus drastically reducing their score for the hand), or may simply concede the hand by allowing the floater to draw (the card drawn is likely to be an unplayable, thus discardable, card).

If a player is floating, and there is no possible card that could be discarded or drawn to prevent that player from being able to discard, they are known as "floating dead"; it is extremely likely the floating player will be forced to end the hand on their next turn. This is rare, and usually happens when the floating player completes a phase involving a long run of cards, no one else has completed their Phase, and the floater's run has expanded through all 12 values. If no one else can lay down a hittable Phase in that turn, only another player playing a Skip or the floater drawing a Skip will keep the hand going, and only four exist in the deck.

 Alternate Wild Card Deal Up Method 
If the dealer turns over a wild card at the beginning of the hand to start the discard pile, the dealer gets to decide who gets the wild card, instead of it automatically going to the player to the left of the dealer. The recipient of the wild card will choose a card from their hand to discard (the card cannot be a Skip), and then play continues with the player to the left of the dealer (or if that player had received the wild card, with the next player to the left after them). This slightly reduces the luck component inherent in the game, increasing the strategic and/or social element.

A similar rule can be used in the case of a Skip card being turned over as the first card.

 Alternate Wild Card Rule 

A "Wild" card can be played as a "Skip" card. (Truly Wild) This method was made popular in 1984 by Allison Steck.

 Masters Edition 

The Masters Edition of the game can be played by two to four players and includes additional rules:

The ability to choose which Phase to attempt (not necessarily in numerical order) based on the cards dealt to the player.  Players must verbally declare which Phase they are attempting during the hand after cards are dealt.
The ability to set aside (or save) one card per hand. (note: you may not save your “Going Out” discard)
The ability to draw one card from their save pile per turn.

The Masters Edition comes with 10 Phase cards for each player to keep track of the Phases which they have completed during gameplay. The Masters Edition also includes only two Skip cards instead of the four that the original edition contains. This makes the playable number of cards 106, plus the forty phase cards, for a total of 146 cards in the box. (An alternate  method of keeping track of phases played for each player to use ace though ten of a suit in regular playing cards.)

 Masters Edition Variant #1 

Same rules as Masters Edition except the player declares what phase they are completing as they lay down the phase.

 Masters Edition Variant #2 

Same rules as Masters Edition except;
The player declares what phase they are completing as they lay down the phase.
After the player lays down the phase and hits on the other players, then they can (if they wish) discard their current laid down phase, perform the normal discard or save and bring their hand back up to ten by drawing from the draw pile and on next turn can work on a new phase. (has to be done on the same turn as phase lay down and cannot be done if the player discards their last card)

 Anti-phase 

In Anti-phase, you have to complete your phase in order to stay on your present phase, if you don't complete your phase you move down a phase.

Anti-phase for others

In Anti-phase for others, a rule card is left in the deck and  it is discarded as your last card. Then you get to name who moves down a phase...if it's stuck in your hand at the end of the hand you move down a phase. It also may be discarded face down but may be picked up by the next player who can draw from the deck.

 Phase 10 Dice 

Phase 10 Dice is dice game inspired by Phase 10 and also published by Fundex Games. The goal is the same, to try to complete the phases, 1-10, in order. Instead of cards, players each take turns rolling 10 six-sided dice, 6 marked with 5-10 and the other four with 1-4 and two wilds each. In each turn the player rolls all 10 dice, then may set aside any of them and re-roll the rest up to two times, for a total of three rolls. If they've completed a phase, the total sum of the dice used in the phase are added to their score and next turn they move on to a new phase. Like in the card game, failing to complete a set means having to try for it again next turn, and the game ends once a player finishes phase 10.

 Phase 10 Twist 

The object of Phase 10 Twist is to be the first player to complete phase 10 by moving around the game board.  Every player starts with their pawn on phase 1 on the game board.  They must complete phase 1 in order to move their pawn.  There are three pawn movements; move 3 spaces if you complete the phase and discard all of your cards, move 2 spaces if you complete the phase but do not discard all of your cards, or move 1 space if you don't complete the phase.  If you land on a twist phase you can decide to play a twist phase or one of the phases on either side of the twist phase space.  If you play a twist phase the pawn movements change to 6 spaces if you complete the phase and discard all of your cards, 4 if you complete the phase but do not discard all of your cards, or move back one space if you do not complete the phase.

 Postal Rules 

Postal Rules follow the standard Phase 10 rules with two additions: 1) No player can go out (play all 10 cards), thus ending the hand, until play has completed one circuit of the table and play has returned to the dealer, regardless if someone was skipped.  The dealer is the first player who can end the hand by playing all 10 of their cards.  2) Players working to complete any of the first seven phases can use the number card that matches the phase they are working to complete as a wild card.  For example, ones are wild for all players during the first hand. During the second hand twos are wild for those players who completed phase one in the previous hand, while ones remain wild for any player not completing phase one.  This adds the challenge of remembering the wild card of the person on your left so as to not discard cards that, for them are wild, but for you are not.  This variation is called Postal Rules in honor of the group of postal employees who have played Phase 10 everyday during lunch since 1996.

Mobile
In 2007 Fundex and Magmic signed a deal that brought Phase 10 to BlackBerry devices.  In 2009 Magmic released the title for iOS, with a Masters Edition in-app purchase available for download in February 2012. In March 2012 Magmic released both a free and paid version of Phase 10 for Android devices. The Google Play Store also has a scorekeeper app for Phase 10. In September 2013, Magmic released Phase 10 Dice in the iTunes App Store. In 2019, Mattel163 Limited released Phase 10: World Tour for Android and iOS, featuring the "Journey" mode which player travels to different worlds and completes levels by completing sets of unique different phases with opponents with different difficulties. The game also introduces Multiplayer, which players can play with others from around the world by spending "coins" and earn more coins if win, similar to the coin system in UNO!, which is another Mattel163's game.

 Tough Luck 
Each wild card played as part of your phase is counted as 25 points toward your score even if you phase out that round.
Wilds can be replaced and reused once laid down; however, any player that steals your wild has assumed the 25 point penalty toward their running total. 
Wilds must stay on the table and can only be replaced and reused during the same turn to phase or hit.

 Special cards 
Wild: A "Wild" card may be used in place of a number card and can be used as any color to complete any phase. Original print runs of Phase 10 had two Wilds in each color; to reduce confusion, current print runs use black Wilds.
More than one “Wild” card may be used in completing a Phase. Players can use as many “Wild” cards as they want as long as they use one natural card.
Once a "Wild" card has been played in a Phase, it cannot be replaced by the intended card and used elsewhere. It must remain as that card until the hand is over.
If the dealer starts the discard pile with a "Wild" card, the card may be picked up by the first player.Skip:' Skip cards have only one purpose: to cause another player to lose a turn.  To use, a player discards the "Skip" card on their turn and chooses the player who will lose a turn.
 When a "Skip" card is drawn it may be discarded immediately or saved for a later turn.
 A "Skip" card may never be picked up from the discard pile.
 A "Skip" card cannot be used to complete any phase, including Phase 8 (seven cards of one color). The original print runs of Phase 10 had blue Skip cards, causing confusion with normal blue cards in deck; Skip cards are now black in current editions.
 The next player to play after you may not be skipped, any player previous to you however, may be skipped.
 A player cannot be skipped twice in the same round; they must lose turn in the round before being skipped again. (They can be skipped twice in a row but not until they miss their turn.)
 If the first card that starts the discard pile is a "skip" card then the first player's turn is skipped.

Notes

References 
 "About Us" Fundex Games 2011. May 22, 2011.

External links 
 Fundex Games
 Phase 10 Mobile by Magmic Games
 Phase 10 at BoardGameGeek
 Phase 10 variants at pagat.com
 Phase 10 for iPhone

Card games introduced in 1982
Mattel
Dedicated deck card games
Shedding-type card games
Matching games
Rummy